The cetacean family Monodontidae comprises two living whale species, the narwhal and the beluga whale and at least four extinct species, known from the fossil record. Beluga and Narwhal are native to coastal regions and pack ice around the Arctic Ocean.  Both species are relatively small whales, between three and five metres in length, with a forehead melon, and a short or absent snout. They do not have a true dorsal fin, but do have a narrow ridge running along the back, which is much more pronounced in the narwhal. They are highly vocal animals, communicating with a wide range of sounds. Like other whales, they also use echolocation to navigate. Belugas can be found in the far north of the Atlantic and Pacific Oceans; the distribution of narwhals is restricted to the Arctic and Atlantic Oceans.

Monodontids have a wide-ranging carnivorous diet, feeding on fish, molluscs, and small crustaceans. They have reduced teeth, with the beluga having numerous simple teeth, and the narwhal having only two teeth, one of which forms the tusks in males. Gestation lasts 14–15 months in both species, and almost always results in a single calf. The young are not weaned for a full two years, and do not reach sexual maturity until they are five to eight years of age. Family groups travel as part of herds, or 'pods', which may contain several hundred individuals.

Taxonomy
 
The monodontids, oceanic dolphins (Delphinidae) and porpoises (Phocoenidae) together comprise the Delphinoidea superfamily.  Genetic evidence suggests the porpoises are more closely related to the white whales, and these two families constitute a separate clade which diverged from the Delphinidae within the past 11 million years.

Suborder Odontoceti 
Superfamily Delphinoidea
Family Monodontidae
Genus †Haborodelphis
Haborodelphis japonicus
Genus † Denebola
Denebola brachycephala
Subfamily Delphinapterinae
Genus Delphinapterus
Delphinapterus leucas, beluga
Genus †Casatia
Casatia thermophila
Subfamily Monodontinae
Genus † BohaskaiaBohaskaia monodontoidesGenus MonodonMonodon monoceros'', narwhal

References

External links

 
Mammal families
Extant Miocene first appearances
Taxa named by John Edward Gray